The Weed Lookout Tower, in Lincoln National Forest in Otero County, New Mexico near Sacramento, New Mexico, was built in 1926.  It was listed on the National Register of Historic Places in 1988.

photos only

References

Fire lookout towers on the National Register of Historic Places in New Mexico
National Register of Historic Places in Otero County, New Mexico
Buildings and structures completed in 1926